Lionel Coleman (29 March 1918 – 25 September 1941) was a Canadian cyclist. He competed in the three events at the 1936 Summer Olympics.

References

External links
 

1918 births
1941 deaths
Canadian male cyclists
Olympic cyclists of Canada
Cyclists at the 1936 Summer Olympics
Place of birth missing
Deaths by drowning in Canada